Rabbi Berel (Yosef Dov) Soloveichik (1915–1981) was a rabbi and the son of Rabbi Yitzchak Zev Soloveichik and one of the leading Rosh Yeshivas ("heads of the yeshiva") of the Brisk yeshivas in Jerusalem. He was a first cousin to Rabbi Joseph B. Soloveitchik, who was named after the Beis HaLevi, like himself. Rabbi Soloveichik was succeeded as Rosh Yeshiva of Yeshivas Brisk in Jerusalem by his son Rabbi Avraham Yehoshua Soloveichik.

Notable students
 Rabbi Elya Brudny, Rosh Yeshiva of Mir Yeshiva (Brooklyn)|Mir Brooklyn
 Rabbi Kalman Epstein, Rosh Yeshiva of Yeshiva Shaar HaTorah- Grodno of Queens
 Rabbi Avrohom Gurwicz, Rosh Yeshiva of Gateshead Talmudical College|Gateshead Talmudical College
 Rabbi Malkiel Kotler, Rosh Yeshiva of Beth Medrash Govoha|Beth Medrash Govoha
 Rabbi Uri Mayerfeld, Rosh Yeshiva of Yeshivas Ner Yisroel of Toronto|Yeshivas Ner Yisroel of Toronto
 Rabbi Shimshon Dovid Pincus|Shimshon Dovid Pincus
 Rabbi Yitzchok Sorotzkin, Rosh Yeshivas  Telshe yeshiva
 Rabbi Meir Stern, Rosh Yeshiva of Yeshiva Gedola of Passaic|Yeshiva Gedola of Passaic
 Rabbi Elya Ber Wachtfogel, Rosh Yeshiva of Yeshiva Gedolah Zichron Moshe|Yeshiva of South Fallsburg

Family Tree

See also
Haredi Judaism
Torah study
Daat Torah
Yosef Dov Soloveitchik (Beis Halevi)

References

1915 births
1981 deaths
Haredi rabbis in Israel
Rosh yeshivas
Soloveitchik rabbinic dynasty